The following is a list of Khmer films released in 2010'''.

List

2010s
Films
Cambodian